The voiceless bilabial fricative is a type of consonantal sound, used in some spoken languages.

Features
Features of the voiceless bilabial fricative:

Occurrence

See also
 Index of phonetics articles

References

Sources

External links
 

Fricative consonants
Bilabial consonants
Pulmonic consonants
Voiceless oral consonants